In World War II, some individuals and organizations and governments  collaborated with the Axis powers, "out of conviction, 
desperation, or under coercion." Nationalists sometimes welcomed German or Italian  troops, believing they brought liberation from colonization. The Vichy, Danish and Belgian governments attempted to appease or bargain with the invaders, in hopes of mitigating harm to their citizens and economies. Some countries cooperated with Italy and Germany because they wanted to regain territory which they had lost during and after the First World War or which their citizens (for example, Hungary's Henrik Werth) simply coveted. Others, such as France, already had fascist movements or anti-semitic sentiment, which the invaders validated and empowered. Individuals such as Hendrik Seyffardt in Czechoslovakia and  Theodoros Pangalos saw  collaboration as a path to power in their country. Others believed that Germany would prevail, and either wanted to be on the winning side, or feared being on the losing end.

Axis military forces recruited many volunteers, often with promises they later broke, or from among POWs trying to escape appalling conditions in their camps. Other volunteers freely enlisted because they subscribed to Nazi or fascist ideology.

In France the term "collaborationist" was coined for those who collaborated for ideological reasons. Bertram Gordon also used the terms "collaborationist" and  "collaborator" for ideological and non-ideological collaboration. Elsewhere, "collaboration" described cooperation, sometimes passive, with a victorious power. 

Stanley Hoffmann saw collaboration as either involuntary, a reluctant recognition of necessity, or voluntary, opportunistic or greedy. He also categorized collaborationism as "servile", attempting to be useful, or "ideological", full-throated advocacy of the occupier's ideology.

Collaboration by country in the Middle East and Africa

British Somaliland 

In the successful Italian invasion of British Somaliland, some Somalis volunteered to fight for Fascist Italy.

Alberto Rovighi, the Italian official historian, wrote that the Italians suffered 465 men killed, 1,530 wounded and 34 missing, a total of 2,029 men, of whom 161 were Italian and 1,868 were in local Eritrean and Somali Askari units of the (Italian) Royal Corps of Eritrean Colonial Troops  (Regio Corpo di Truppe Coloniali). About 1,000 Somali irregulars became casualties fighting on the Italian side.

Egypt
The well-publicized Arab-Jewish clash in Mandatory Palestine from 1936 to 1939, and the rise of Nazi Germany, began to affect Jewish relations with Egyptian society, despite the fact that the number of active Zionists was small. Local militant and nationalistic societies like the Young Egypt Party and the Society of Muslim Brothers, circulated reports claiming that Jews and the British were destroying holy places in Jerusalem, and other false reports that hundreds of Arab women and children were being killed. Some of this antisemitism was fueled by an association between Hitler's regime and anti-imperialist Arab activists. One of these, Haj Amin al-Husseini, secured Nazi funds for the Muslim Brotherhood to print and distribute thousands of anti-Semitic propaganda pamphlets.

In the 1940s the situation worsened. Sporadic pogroms took place from 1942 on.

French colonial empire
France retained control of its colonial empire, and the terms of the armistice shifted the balance of power of France's reduced military resources away from France and towards its colonies, especially North Africa. By 1943, all French colonies, except for Japanese-controlled Indochina, had joined the Free French cause.
The colonies in North Africa and French Equatorial Africa in particular played a key role

French North Africa 
Concerned that the French fleet might fall into German hands, the British Royal Navy sank or disabled most of it (killing over a thousand French sailors) in a July 1940 attack on the Algerian naval port at Mers-el-Kébir.

When Operation Torch, the Allied invasion of French North Africa, began 8 November 1942 with landings in Morocco and Algeria, Vichy forces initially resisted, killing 479 and wounding 720. Admiral François Darlan nominated himself High Commissioner of France (head of civil government) for North and West Africa, then ordered Vichy forces there to stop resisting and co-operate with the Allies, which they did.

Most Vichy figures were arrested, including General Alphonse Juin, chief commander in North Africa, and Admiral François Darlan.  Both were released, and US General Dwight D. Eisenhower accepted his self-nomination. This infuriated , and he refused to recognise Darlan. Darlan was then assassinated on Christmas Eve 1942 by a French monarchist.

German Wehrmacht forces in North Africa established the Kommando Deutsch-Arabische Truppen, which comprised two battalions of Arab volunteers of Tunisian origin, an Algerian battalion and a Moroccan battalion. The four units made up a total of 3,000 men; with German cadres.

Morocco

In 1940,  Résident Général Charles Noguès implemented antisemitic decrees coming from Vichy excluding Jews working as doctors, lawyers or teachers. All Jews living elsewhere were required to move to the Jewish quarters named , Vichy anti-semitic propaganda encouraged boycotting Jews, and pamphlets were pinned to Jewish shops. These laws put Moroccan Jews in an uncomfortable position "between an indifferent Muslim majority and an antisemitic settler class." 

Sultan Mohammed V reportedly refused to sign off on "Vichy's plan to ghettoize and deport Morocco's quarter of a million Jews to the killing factories of Europe," and, in an act of defiance, insisted on inviting all the rabbis of Morocco to the 1941 throne celebrations.

Tunisia

Many Tunisians took satisfaction in France's defeat by Germany in June 1940, but little else. Despite his commitment to ending the French protectorate, the pragmatic independence leader Habib Bourguiba abhorred the Axis state ideologies. and feared any short-term benefit would come at the cost of long-term tragedy. 

After the Second Armistice at Compiègne, Pétain sent a new Resident-General to Tunis, Admiral Jean-Pierre Esteva.

Bey Muhammad VII al-Munsif moved towards greater independence in 1942, but when the Free French forced out the Axis powers in 1943, they accused him of collaborating with Vichy and deposed him.

French Equatorial Africa
The federation of colonies in French Equatorial Africa (AEF or Afrique-Équatoriale française) rallied to the cause of  after  Félix Éboué of Chad joined him in August 1940. The exception was Gabon, which remained Vichy French until 12 November 1940, when it surrendered to the invading Free French. The federation became the strategic centre of Free French activities in Africa.

Syria and the Lebanon (League of Nations mandates)

The Vichy government's Armée du Levant (Army of the Levant) under General Henri Dentz had regular metropolitan colonial troops and troupes spéciales (special troops, indigenous Syrian and Lebanese soldiers). He had seven infantry battalions of regular French troops at his disposal, and eleven infantry battalions of "special troops", including at least 5,000 cavalry in horsed and motorized units, two artillery groups and supporting units. The French had  (according to British estimates), the Armée de l'air had  (increasing to  after reinforcement) and the Marine nationale (French Navy) had two destroyers,a sloop and three submarines.

The Royal Air Force attacked the airfield at Palmyra, in central Syria, on 14 May 1941, after a  reconnaissance mission had spotted German and Italian aircraft. Attacks against German and Italian aircraft staging through Syria continued: Vichy French forces shot down a Blenheim bomber on 28 May, killing the crew, and forced down another on 2 June. French Morane-Saulnier M.S.406 fighters also escorted German Junkers Ju 52 aircraft into Iraq on 28 May. Germany permitted French aircraft en route from Algeria to Syria to fly over Axis-controlled territory and refuel at the German-controlled Eleusina air base in Greece. 

After the Armistice of Saint Jean d'Acre, on 14 July 1941, 37,736 Vichy French prisoners of war survived, who mostly chose to be repatriated rather than join the Free French.

Collaboration by country in Europe

Albania 

After the Italian invasion of Albania, the Royal Albanian Army, police and gendarmerie were amalgamated into the Italian armed forces in the newly created Italian protectorate of Albania. 

The Albanian Fascist Militia formed, and in the Yugoslav part of Kosovo, established the Vulnetari (or Kosovars), a volunteer militia of Albanians from Kosovo. Vulnetari units often attacked ethnic Serbs and carried out raids against civilian targets. They burned down hundreds of Serbian and Montenegrin villages, killed many people, and plundered the Kosovo and neighboring regions.

Ethnic Albanian elements of the Italian armed forces participated in the Italian invasion of Greece and the German-led Axis invasion of Yugoslavia. After Italy capitulated, the Germans established police volunteer regiments and a national militia.

Baltic states 

The three Baltic republics of Estonia, Latvia and Lithuania, first invaded by the Soviet Union, were later occupied by Germany and incorporated, together with the Byelorussian Soviet Socialist Republic of the U.S.S.R. (Belarus, see below), into Reichskommissariat Ostland.

Estonia 
In German plans, Estonia was to become an area of future German colonization, but Estonians themselves were considered to be standing high on the Nazi racial scale and as such had the potential for Germanization. Unlike the other Baltic states, the seizure of Estonian territory by German troops was relatively long, from July 7 to December 2, 1941. This period was used by the Soviets to carry out a wave of repression against Estonians. It is estimated that the NKVD's subordinate Destruction battalions killed some 2,000 Estonian civilians, and 50-60,000 people were deported deep to the USSR. 10,000 of them died in the GULAG system within a year. Many Estonians fought against Soviet troops on the German side, hoping to liberate their country. Some 12,000 Estonian partisans took part in the fighting. Of great importance were the 57 Finnish-trained members of the Erna group, who operated behind enemy lines. 

Resistance groups were organised by Germans in August 1941 into the Omakaitse, which had between 34,000 and 40,000 members, mainly based on the Kaitseliit, dissolved by the Soviets. Omakaitse was in charge of clearing the German army's rear of Red Army soldiers, NKVD members, and Communist activists. Within a year its members killed 5,500 Estonian residents. Later, they performed guard duty and fought Soviet partisans flown into Estonia. From among Omakaitse members were recruited Estonian policemen, members of the Estonian Auxiliary Police and officers of the Estonian 20th Waffen-SS Division.

The Germans formed a puppet government, the Estonian Self-Administration, headed by Hjalmar Mäe. This government had considerable autonomy in internal affairs, such as filling police posts. The Security Police in Estonia (SiPo) had a mixed Estonian-German structure (139 Germans and 873 Estonians) and was formally under the Estonian Self-Administration. Estonian police cooperated with Germans in rounding up Jews, Roma, communists and all people that were deemed enemies of existing order or asocial elements, they also helped to conscript Estonians for forced labor and military service under German command. Most of the small population of Estonian Jews fled  before the Germans arrived, with only about 1,000 remaining. All of them were arrested by Estonian police and executed by Omakaitse. Members of the Estonian Auxiliary Police and 20th Waffen-SS Division also executed Jewish prisoners sent to concentration and labor camps established by the Germans on Estonian territory.

Immediately after entering Estonia, the Germans began forming volunteer Estonian units the size of a battalion. By January 1942, six Security Groups (battalions No. 181-186, about 4,000 men) had been formed and were subordinate to the Wermacht 18th Army. After the one-year contract expired, some volunteers transferred to the Waffen-SS or returned to civilian life, and three Eastern Battalions (No. 658-660) were formed from those who remained. They fought until early 1944, after which their members transferred to the 20th Waffen-SS Division.

Beginning in September 1941, the SS and police command created four Infantry Defence Battalions (No. 37-40) and a reserve and sapper battalion (No. 41-42), which were operationally subordinate to the Wermacht. From 1943 they were called Police Battalions, with 3,000 serving in them. In 1944 they were transformed into two infantry battalions and evacuated to Germany in the fall of 1944, where they were incorporated into the 20th Waffen-SS Division.

The Germans also formed in the fall of 1941, eight police battalions (No. 29-36) of which only Battalion No. 36 had a typically military purpose. However, due to shortages, most of them were sent to the front near Leningrad. These battalions were mostly disbanded in 1943. That same year, the SS and police command created five new Security and Defense Battalions (they inherited No. 29-33 and had more than 2,600 men). In the spring of 1943, five Defence Battalions (No. 286-290) were established as compulsory military service units. The 290th Battalion consisted of Estonian Russians. Battalions No. 286, 288 and 289 were used to fight partisans in Belarus.

On Aug. 28, 1942, the Germans formed the volunteer Estonian Waffen-SS Legion. Of the approximately 1,000 volunteers, 800 were incorporated into Battalion Narva and sent to Ukraine in the spring of 1943. Due to the shrinking number of volunteers, in February 1943 the Germans introduced compulsory conscription in Estonia. Born between 1919 and 1924 faced the choice of going to work in Germany, joining the Waffen-SS or Estonian auxiliary battalions. 5,000 joined the Estonian Waffen-SS Legion, which was reorganized into the 3rd Estonian Waffen-SS Brigade.

As the Red Army advanced, a general mobilization was announced, officially supported by Estonia's last Prime Minister Jüri Uluots. By April 1944, 38,000 Estonians had been drafted. A portion was drafted into the 3rd Waffen-SS Brigade, which was enlarged to division size (20th Waffen-SS Division: 10 battalions, more than 15,000 men in the summer of 1944) and incorporated also most of the already existing Estionian units (mostly Eastern Battalions). The younger ones were conscripted into other Waffen-SS units. From the rest, six Border Defense Regiments and four Police Fusilier Battalions (Nos. 286, 288, 291, and 292).

The Estonian Security Police and SD, the 286th, 287th and 288th Estonian Auxiliary Police battalions, and 2.5–3% of the Estonian Omakaitse (Home Guard) militia units (between 1,000 and 1,200 men) took part in rounding up, guarding or killing of 400–1,000 Roma and 6,000 Jews in concentration camps in the Pskov region of Russia and the Jägala, Vaivara, Klooga and Lagedi concentration camps in Estonia.

Guarded by these units, 15,000 Soviet POWs died in Estonia: some through neglect and mistreatment and some by execution.

Latvia 

Deportations and murders of Latvians by the Soviet NKVD reached their peak in the days before the capture of Soviet-occupied Riga by German forces. Those that the NKVD could not deport before the Germans arrivec were shot at the Central Prison. RSHA's instructions to their agents to unleash pogroms fell on fertile ground. After the Einsatzkommando 1a and part of Einsatzkommando 2 entered the Latvian capital, Einsatzgruppe A's commander Franz Walter Stahlecker made contact with Viktors Arājs on 1 July and instructed him to set up a commando unit. It was later named Latvian Auxiliary Police or Arajs Kommandos. The members, far-right students and former officers were all volunteers, and free to leave at any time. The next day, 2 July, Stahlecker instructed Arājs to have the Arājs Kommandos unleash pogroms that looked spontaneous, before the German occupation authorities were properly established. 

Einsatzkommando-influenced mobs of former members of Pērkonkrusts and other extreme right-wing groups began pillaging and making mass arrests, and killed 300 to 400 Riga Jews. Killings continued under the supervision of SS Brigadeführer Walter Stahlecker, until more than 2,700 Jews had died. The activities of the Einsatzkommando were constrained after the full establishment of the German occupation authority, after which the SS made use of select units of native recruits. German General Wilhelm Ullersperger and Voldemārs Veiss, a well known Latvian nationalist, appealed to the population in a radio address to attack "internal enemies". During the next few months, the Latvian Auxiliary Security Police primarily focused on killing Jews, Communists and Red Army stragglers in Latvia and in neighbouring Byelorussia. In February–March 1943, eight Latvian battalions took part in the punitive anti-partisan Operation Winterzauber near the Belarus–Latvia border which resulted in 439 burned villages, 10,000 to 12,000 deaths, and over 7,000 taken for forced labor or imprisoned at the Salaspils concentration camp. This group alone killed almost half of Latvia's Jewish population, about 26,000 Jews, mainly in November and December 1941.

The creation of the Arājs Kommando was "one of the most significant inventions of the early Holocaust", and marked a transition from German-organised pogroms to systematic killing of Jews by local volunteers (former army officers, policemen, students, and Aizsargi). This helped resolve a chronic German personnel shortage and provided the Germans with relief from the psychological stress of routinely murdering civilians. By the autumn of 1941, the SS deployed Latvian Auxiliary Police battalions to Leningrad, where they were consolidated into the 2nd Latvian SS Infantry Brigade. In 1943, this brigade, which later became the 19th Waffen Grenadier Division of the SS (2nd Latvian), was consolidated with the 15th Waffen Grenadier Division of the SS (1st Latvian) to become the Latvian Legion. Although formally the Latvian Legion was a volunteer Waffen-SS unit, it was voluntary only in name; approximately 80–85% of its men were conscripts.

Lithuania 

Prior to the German invasion, some leaders in Lithuania and in exile believed Germany would grant the country autonomy, as they had the Slovak Republic. German intelligence Abwehr believed that it controlled the Lithuanian Activist Front, a pro-German organization based at the Lithuanian embassy in Berlin.  Lithuanians formed the Provisional Government of Lithuania on their own initiative, but Germany did not recognize it diplomatically, or allow Lithuanian ambassador Kazys Škirpa to become prime minister. They actively thwarted his activities. The provisional government disbanded, since it had no power and it had become clear that the Germans came as occupiers not liberators from Soviet occupation, as initially thought.

Units under Algirdas Klimaitis and supervised by SS Brigadeführer Walter Stahlecker started pogroms in and around Kaunas on 25 June 1941. Lithuanian collaborators killed hundreds of thousands of Jews, Poles and Gypsies. Lithuanian-American scholar Saulius Sužiedėlis says that an  increasingly antisemitic atmosphere clouded Lithuanian society, and antisemitic LAF émigrés "needed little prodding from 'foreign influences. He concluded that Lithuanian collaboration was "a significant help in facilitating all phases of the genocidal program . . . [and that] the local administration contributed, at times with zeal, to the destruction of Lithuanian Jewry". Elsewhere, Sužiedėlis similarly emphasised that Lithuania's "moral and political leadership failed in 1941, and that thousands of Lithuanians participated in the Holocaust", though he warned that "[u]ntil buttressed by reliable accounts providing time, place and at least an approximate number of victims, claims of large-scale pogroms before the advent of the German forces must be treated with caution". 

In 1941, the Lithuanian Security Police was created, subordinate to Nazi Germany's Security Police and Criminal Police. Of the 26 Lithuanian Auxiliary Police Battalions, 10 were involved in the Holocaust. On August 16, the head of the Lithuanian police, ordered the arrest of Jewish men and women with Bolshevik activities: "In reality, it was a sign to kill everyone." The Special SD and German Security Police Squad in Vilnius killed 70,000 Jews in Paneriai and other places. In Minsk, the 2nd Battalion shot about 9,000 Soviet prisoners of war, and in Slutsk it massacred 5,000 Jews. 

In March 1942 in Poland, the 2nd Lithuanian Battalion guarded the Majdanek concentration camp. In July 1942, the 2nd Battalion participated in the deportation of Jews from the Warsaw Ghetto to Treblinka extermination camp. In August–October 1942, some of the Lithuanian police battalions were in Belarus and Ukraine: the 3rd in Molodechno, the 4th in Donetsk, the 7th in Vinnytsa, the 11th in Korosten, the 16th in Dnepropetrovsk, the 254th in Poltava and the 255th in Mogilev (Belarus). One battalion was also used to put down the Warsaw Ghetto Uprising in 1943.

The participation of the local populace was a key factor in the Holocaust in Nazi-occupied Lithuania which resulted in the near total decimation of Lithuanian Jews living in the Nazi-occupied Lithuanian territories that would, from 25 July 1941, become the Generalbezirk Litauen of Reichskommissariat Ostland. Out of approximately 210,000 Jews, (208,000 according to the Lithuanian pre-war statistical data) an estimated 195,000–196,000 perished before the end of World War II (wider estimates are sometimes published); most from June to December 1941. The events happening in the USSR's western regions occupied by Nazi Germany in the first weeks after the German invasion (including Lithuania – see map) marked the sharp intensification of the Holocaust.

Belgium 

Belgium was invaded by Nazi Germany in May 1940 and remained under German occupation until the end of 1944.

Political collaboration took separate forms across the Belgian language divide. In Dutch-speaking Flanders, the Vlaamsch Nationaal Verbond (Flemish National Union or VNV), clearly authoritarian and anti-democratic from its beginnings, and influenced by fascist ideas elsewhere in Europe, was part of the pre-war Flemish Movement, and became a major player in the German occupation strategy. VNV politicians were promoted to positions in the Belgian civil administration. VNV and its comparatively moderate stance was increasingly eclipsed later in the war by the more radical and pro-German DeVlag movement. 

In French-speaking Wallonia, Léon Degrelle's Rexist Party, a pre-war authoritarian and Catholic Fascist political party, became the VNV's Walloon equivalent, although Rex's Belgian nationalism put it at odds with the Flemish nationalism of VNV and the German Flamenpolitik. Rex became increasingly radical after 1941 and declared itself part of the Waffen-SS. 

Although the pre-war Belgian government went into exile in 1940, the Belgian civil service remained in place for much of the occupation. The Committee of Secretaries-General, an administrative panel of civil servants, although conceived as a purely techocratic institution, has been accused of helping to implement German occupation policies. Despite its intention to mitigate harm to Belgians, it enabled but could not moderate German policies such as the persecution of Jews and deportation of workers to Germany, although it did manage to delay the latter to October 1942. Encouraging the Germans to delegate tasks to the Committee allowed much more efficient implementation than could have been achieved by force. Since Belgium depended on Germany for food imports, the committee was always at a disadvantage in negotiations.

The Belgian government in exile criticized the committee for helping the Germans. The Secretaries-General were also unpopular within Belgium itself. In 1942, the journalist Paul Struye described them as "the object of growing and almost unanimous unpopularity." As the face of the German occupation authority, they became unpopular with the public, which blamed them for the German demands they implemented.

After the war, several of the Secretaries-General were tried for collaboration. Most were quickly acquitted. , the former secretary-general for internal affairs, was sentenced to 20 years imprisonment and Gaston Schuind (Judicial Police of Brussels) was sentenced to five. Many former secretaries-general had careers in politics after the war. Victor Leemans served as a  senator from the centre-right Christian Social Party (PSC-CVP) and became president of the European Parliament.

Belgian police have also been accused of collaborating, especially in the Holocaust.

Towards the end of the war, militias of collaborationist parties actively carried out reprisals for resistance attacks or assassinations, including assassinations of leading figures suspected of resistance involvement or sympathy, including Alexandre Galopin, head of the Société Générale, assassinated in February 1944. Retaliatory massacres of civilians, among them the Courcelles Massacre,in which 20 civilians were killed by the Rexist paramilitary for the assassination of a Burgomaster. A similar massacre also took place at Meensel-Kiezegem, where 67 were killed.

Britain

Channel Islands 

The Channel Islands were the only British territory in Europe occupied by Nazi Germany. The policy of the islands' governments was what they called "correct relations" with the German occupiers. There was no armed or violent resistance by islanders to the occupation. After 1945 allegations of collaboration were investigated. In November 1946, the UK Home Secretary informed the UK House of Commons that most allegations lacked substance. Only 12 cases of collaboration were considered for prosecution, and the Director of Public Prosecutions had ruled them out for insufficient grounds. In particular, it was decided that there were no legal grounds for proceeding against those alleged to have informed the occupying authorities against their fellow citizens.

In Jersey and Guernsey, laws were passed to retrospectively confiscate the financial gains made by war profiteers and black marketeers, although these measures also affected those who had made legitimate profits during the years of military occupation.

During the occupation, women who fraternized with German soldiers had aroused indignation among some citizens. After the liberation, British soldiers had  to intervene to prevent revenge attacks.

Bulgaria 

Bulgaria was interested in acquiring Thessalonica and western Macedonia and hoped to gain the allegiance of the 80,000 Slavs who lived there at the time. The appearance of Greek partisans there persuaded Axis forces to allow the formation of Ohrana collaborationist detachments. The organization managed to initially recruit 1,000 to 3,000 armed men from the Slavophone community that lived in the western part of Greek Macedonia.

Czechoslovakia 

When the Germans annexed Czechoslovakia in 1938 and 1939, they created the Protectorate of Bohemia and Moravia from the Czech part of pre-war Czechoslovakia It had its own military forces, including a 12-battalion 'government army', police and gendarmerie. The majority of the 'government army' was sent to Northern Italy in 1944 as labourers and guard troops. Whether or not the government army can be considered a collaborationist force has been debated. Its commanding officer, Jaroslav Eminger, was tried and acquitted on charges of collaboration following World War II. Some members of the force engaged in active resistance operations while in the army, and, in the waning days of the conflict, elements of the army joined in the Prague uprising.

The Slovak Republic (Slovenská Republika) was a quasi-independent ethnic Slovak state which existed from 14 March 1939 to 8 May 1945 as an ally and client state of Nazi Germany. The Slovak Republic existed on roughly the same territory as present-day Slovakia (except for the southern and eastern parts of present-day Slovakia). It bordered Germany, the Protectorate of Bohemia and Moravia, German-occupied Poland, and Hungary.

Denmark 

When on 9 April 1940, German forces invaded neutral Denmark, they violated a treaty of non-aggression they'd signed the year before, but claimed they would "respect Danish sovereignty and territorial integrity, and neutrality." The Danish government quickly  surrendered and remained intact. The parliament maintained control over domestic policy. Danish public opinion generally backed the new government, particularly after the Fall of France in June 1940.

Denmark's government cooperated with the German occupiers until 1943, and helped organize sales of industrial and agricultural products to Germany.
The Danish government enacted a number of policies to satisfy Germany and retain the social order. Newspaper articles and news reports "which might jeopardize German-Danish relations" were outlawed and on 25 November 1941, Denmark joined the Anti-Comintern Pact. The Danish government and King Christian X repeatedly discouraged sabotage and encouraged informing on the resistance movement. Resistance fighters were imprisoned or executed, and after the war informants were sentenced to death.

Prior to, during and after the war Denmark enforced a restrictive refugee policy and handed at least 21 Jewish refugees that had managed to get over the border over to German authorities; 18 of these people died in concentration camps, including a woman and her three children. In 2005 prime minister Anders Fogh Rasmussen officially apologized for these policies.

Following the German invasion of the Soviet Union on 22 June 1941, German authorities demanded the arrest of
Danish communists. The Danish government complied and directed the police to arrest 339 communists listed on secret registers. Of these, 246, including the three communist members of the Danish parliament, were imprisoned in the Horserød camp, in violation of the Danish constitution. On 22 August 1941, the Danish parliament passed the Communist Law, outlawing the Communist Party of Denmark and also communist activities, in another violation of the Danish constitution. In 1943, about half of the imprisoned communists were transferred to Stutthof concentration camp, where 22 of them died.

Industrial production and trade were, partly due to geopolitical reality and economic necessity, redirected towards Germany. Many government officials saw expanded trade with Germany as vital to maintaining social order in Denmark. It was feared that increased unemployment and poverty could lead to civil unrest, resulting in a crackdown by the Germans. Unemployment benefits could be denied if jobs were available in Germany, so an average 20,000 Danes worked in German factories through the five years of the war.

The Danish cabinet however rejected German demands for legislation discriminating against Denmark's Jewish minority. Demands for a death penalty were likewise rebuffed and so were demands to give German military courts jurisdiction over Danish citizens and for the transfer of Danish army units to the German military.

France 

A hero for saving lives at  Verdun in World War I, Marshal Philippe Pétain became the head of the post-democratic French State when the French Third Republic collapsed after a catastrophic French loss in the Battle of France. Prime minister Paul Reynaud had resigned rather than sign the resulting armistice agreement. The National Assembly voted to have Pétain convoke a constituent assembly, which he never did. The resulting authoritarian government operated outside the bounds of the French constitution and was largely run by its ministers. 
 

The illusion of autonomy was important to the Vichy cabinet, which wanted at costs to avoid direct rule by the German military government. Pierre Laval and other Vichy prime ministers initially prioritized saving French lives and repatriating French prisoners of war. 

[One lever of pressure by the German authorities in Paris was the implicit threat of replacing Vichy with several explicitly pro-Nazi parties and leaders (for example Marcel Déat and Jacques Doriot), who were permitted to operate, publish and criticize Vichy for insufficiently-enthusiastic cooperation with Germany. These parties collaborated in organizing and recruiting the Legion of French Volunteers Against Bolshevism to fight alongside German forces on the Eastern Front.]

To placate Germany, the Vichy French government eventually sacrificed not only foreign-born but also French-born Jews to concentration camps. It initially reached an agreement  with Germany to recruit three French volunteers to work in German factories in exchange for every repatriated French prisoner-of-war, but — when this scheme (la Relève) failed to draw enough workers to please the Reich — Vichy started conscripting Frenchmen into the Service du Travail Obligatoire (obligatory labour service or STO).

Many workers went into hiding or joined the French Resistance rather than report for the STO. This made the occupation personal to many young French people. Able-bodied French citizens who faced forced labor in Germany began instead to disappear into forests and mountain wildernesses to join the maquis (or rural Resistance).

Vichy collaboration with the Holocaust

Pierre Laval was an important decision-maker in the extermination of Jews, the Porajmos (holocaust) of Roma people (Gypsies), and the extermination of other "undesirables." Following an increasingly restrictive series of anti-Semitic and anti-Masonic measures. such as the Second law on the status of Jews, Vichy opened a series of internment camps in France where Jews, Gypsies, homosexuals, and political opponents were interned.  The French police, directed by René Bousquet and under increasing German pressure, helped to deport 76,000 Jews (both directly and via the French camps) to the Nazi concentration and extermination camps. 

In 1995, President Jacques Chirac officially recognized the responsibility of the French state for the deportation of Jews during the war, in particular, the more than 13,000 victims of the Vel' d'Hiv Roundup of July 1942, during which Laval had decided, of his own volition (and without being requested by the occupying German authorities), to deport children along with their parents. Only 2,500 of the deported Jews survived the war. The French police were also organized by Bousquet to work with the Gestapo in the massive Marseille roundup (rafle) that destroyed a whole neighbourhood in the Old Port.

Aftermath

As the Liberation spread across France in 1944-45, so did the so-called Wild Purges (Épuration sauvage). Resistance groups took summary reprisals, especially against suspected informers and members of Vichy's anti-partisan, paramilitary, Milice. They would also join with local citizens to form unofficial courts that tried and punished thousands of people accused (sometimes unjustly) of collaborating and consorting with the enemy. Estimates of the numbers of victims differ, but historians agree that the number will never be fully known.

Then, as General Charles de Gaulle and his allies gradually reimposed a formal legal order over France, the informal purges were replaced by l'Épuration légale (or legal purge), whose most notable, and most demanded, convictions were those of Pierre Laval, tried and executed in October 1945, and Marshal Philippe Pétain, tried, convicted, and sentenced to death in the summer of 1945, later commuted to life imprisonment on the Bréton island of Yeu, where he died in 1951.

Several decades later, a few surviving ex-collaborators such as Paul Touvier were tried for crimes against humanity. René Bousquet was rehabilitated and regained some influence in French politics, finance and journalism, but was nonetheless investigated in 1991 for deporting Jews. He was assassinated in 1993 just before his trial would have begun. Maurice Papon served as prefect of the Paris police under President de Gaulle (thus bearing ultimate responsibility for the Paris massacre of 1961) and, 20 years later, Budget Minister under President Valéry Giscard d'Estaing before his 1998 conviction for crimes against humanity in organizing the deportation of 1,560 Jews from the Bordeaux region to the French internment camp at Drancy.

Other collaborators such as Émile Dewoitine also managed to have important roles after the war. Dewoitine was eventually named head of Aérospatiale, which created the Concorde airplane.

Greece 

Germany put a Nazi government in place in Greece. Prime ministers Georgios Tsolakoglou, Konstantinos Logothetopoulos and Ioannis Rallis all cooperated with Axis authorities. Greece exported agricultural products, especially tobacco, to Germany, and Greek "volunteers" worked in German factories.
 
The collaborationist government created armed paramilitary forces such as the Security Battalions, to fight the EAM/ELAS resistance Former dictator General Theodoros Pangalos saw the Security Battalions as a way to make a political comeback, and most of the Hellenic Army officers recruited in April 1943 were republicans in some way associated with Pangalos. 

Greek National-Socialist parties like George S. Mercouris' Greek National Socialist Party of the ESPO organization, or such openly anti-semitic organisations as the National Union of Greece, helped German authorities fight the Greek resistance, and identify and deport Greek Jews. The BUND Organization and its leader Aginor Giannopoulos trained a battalion of Greek volunteers who fought in SS and Brandenburgers units.

During the Axis occupation, a number of Cham Albanians set up their own administration and militia in Thesprotia, Greece, under the Balli Kombëtar organization, and actively collaborated with first Italian and then German occupation forces, committing a number of atrocities. In one incident on 29 September 1943, Nuri and Mazzar Dino, Albanian paramilitary leaders, instigated the mass execution of all Greek officials and notables in Paramythia.

An Aromanian political and paramilitary force, the Roman Legion led by Aromanian nationalists Alcibiades Diamandi and Nicolaos Matussis, also collaborated  with Italian forces.

Hungary
In April 1941, in order to regain territory and under German pressure, Hungary allowed the Wehrmacht across its territory in the invasion of Yugoslavia. Hungarian foreign minister Pál Teleki wanted to maintain a pro-Allies neutral stance, but could no longer stay out of the war. British Foreign Secretary Anthony Eden threatened to break diplomatic relations if  Hungary did not actively resist the passage of German troops across its territory. General Henrik Werth, chief of the Hungarian General Staff, made a private arrangement, unsanctioned by the Hungarian government, with the  German High Command to transport German troops across Hungary. Pál Teleki, unable to stop these events, committed suicide on April 3, 1941. After the war the Hungarian People's Court sentenced General Werth to death for war crimes. 
 
Hungary joined the war on April 11, after the proclamation of the Independent State of Croatia.

It is not clear whether the 10,000–20,000 Jewish refugees (from Poland and elsewhere) were counted in the January 1941 census. They, and about 20,000 people who could not prove legal residency since 1850, were deported to southern Poland. According to Nazi German reports, a total of 23,600 Jews were murdered, including 16,000 who had earlier been expelled from Hungary. between July 15 and August 12, 1941, and either abandoned there or handed over to the Germans. In practice, the Hungarians deported many people whose families had lived in the area for generations. In some cases, applications for residency permits were allowed to pile up without action by Hungarian officials until after the deportations had been carried out. The vast majority (16,000) of those deported were massacred in Kameniec-Podolsk (Kamianets-Podilskyi massacre) at the end of August.

In the massacres in Újvidék (Novi Sad) and nearby villages, 2,550–2,850 Serbs, 700–1,250 Jews and 60–130 others were murdered by the Hungarian Army and "Csendőrség" (gendarmerie) in January 1942. Those responsible, Ferenc Feketehalmy-Czeydner, József Grassy, László Deák and others were later tried in Budapest in December 1943 and were sentenced, but some escaped to Germany.

During the war, Jews were called up to serve in unarmed "labour service" units which repaired bombed railroads, built airports or cleaned up minefields at the front barehanded. Approximately 42,000 Jewish labour service troops were killed on the Soviet front in 1942–43, of whom about 40% perished in Soviet POW camps. Many died as a result of harsh conditions on the Eastern Front and cruel treatment by their Hungarian sergeants and officers. Another 4,000 forced laborers died in the copper mine of Bor, Serbia. Nevertheless, Miklós Kállay, prime minister from March 9, 1942, and Regent Miklós Horthy refused to allow the deportation of Hungarian Jews to German extermination camps in occupied Poland. This lasted until  German troops occupied Hungary and forced Horthy to oust Kállay.

Following the German occupation of Hungary on March 19, 1944, Jews from the provinces were deported to the Auschwitz concentration camp; between May and July that year, 437,000 Jews were sent there from Hungary, most of them gassed on arrival.

Luxembourg 

Luxembourg was invaded by Nazi Germany in May 1940 and remained under German occupation until early 1945. Initially, the country was governed as a distinct region as the Germans prepared to assimilate its Germanic population into Germany itself. The Volksdeutsche Bewegung (VdB) was founded in Luxembourg in 1941 under the leadership of Damian Kratzenberg, a German teacher at the Athénée de Luxembourg. It aimed to encourage the population towards a pro-German position, prior to outright annexation, using the slogan Heim ins Reich. In August 1942, Luxembourg was annexed into Nazi Germany, and Luxembourgish men were drafted into the German military.

Monaco 
During the Nazi occupation of Monaco, the Monaco police arrested and turned over 42 Central European Jewish refugees to the Nazis while also protecting Monaco's own Jews.

Netherlands 

The Germans re-organized the pre-war Dutch police and established a new Communal Police, which helped Germans fight resistance and deport Jews. The National Socialist Movement in the Netherlands (NSB) had militia units, whose members were transferred to other paramilitaries like the Netherlands Landstorm or the Control Commando. A small number of people greatly assisted the German in their hunt for Jews, including some policemen and the Henneicke Column. Many of them were members of the NSB. The column alone was responsible for the arrest of about 900 Jews.

During the war famous actor and singer Johannes Heesters made his career in Nazi Germany, befriending high-ranking Nazis such as Joseph Goebbels and living in houses stolen from wealthy Jews.

Norway 

In Norway, the national government, headed by Vidkun Quisling, was installed by the Germans as a puppet regime during the German occupation, while king Haakon VII and the legally elected Norwegian government fled into exile. Quisling encouraged Norwegians to volunteer for service in the Waffen-SS, collaborated in the deportation of Jews, and was responsible for the executions of members of the Norwegian resistance movement.

About 45,000 Norwegian collaborators joined the fascist party Nasjonal Samling (National Union), and about 8,500 of them enlisted in the Hirden collaborationist paramilitary organization. About 15,000 Norwegians volunteered on the Nazi side and 6,000 joined the Germanic SS. In addition, Norwegian police units like the Statspolitiet helped arrest many of Jews in Norway. All but 23 of the 742 Jews deported to concentration camps and death camps were murdered or died before the end of the war. Knut Rød, the Norwegian police officer most responsible for the arrest, detention and transfer of Jewish men, women and children to SS troops at Oslo harbour, was later acquitted during the legal purge in Norway after World War II in two highly publicized trials that remain controversial to this day.

Nasjonal Samling had very little support among the population at large and Norway was one of few countries where resistance during World War II was widespread before the turning point of the war in 1942–43. 

After the war, Quisling was executed by firing squad. His name became an international eponym for "traitor".

Poland 

Unlike most German-occupied European countries, occupied Poland did not have a collaborationist government. The Polish government did not surrender, but instead moved into exile, first in France, then in London, while evacuating the armed forces via Romania and Hungary and by sea to allied France and Great Britain. German-occupied Polish territory was either annexed outright by Nazi Germany or placed under German administration as the General Government.

Shortly after the German Invasion of Poland, the Nazi authorities ordered the mobilization of prewar Polish officials and the Polish police (the Blue Police), who were ordered to report for duty under threat of the "severest penalty". Apart from serving as a regular police force dealing with criminal activities, the Blue Police was used by the Germans also to combat smuggling and resistance, to round up (łapanka) random civilians for forced labor, and to apprehend Jews (German: Judenjagd, "hunting Jews") and participate in their extermination. Polish policemen were instrumental in implementing the Nazi policy of centralising Jews in ghettos and, from 1942 onwards, liquidating the ghettos. In the late autumn and early winter of 1941, shooting Jews, including women and children, became one of their many activities at the orders of the German occupiers. After an initial phase of hesitation, Polish policemen became familiar with Nazi brutality and, according to Jan Grabowski, in many cases even "surpassed their German teachers." While many officials and police followed German orders, some acted as agents for the Polish resistance. 

Some of the collaborators – szmalcowniks – blackmailed Jews and their Polish rescuers and acted as informers, turning in Jews and Poles who hid them, and reporting on the Polish resistance. Many prewar Polish citizens of German descent voluntarily declared themselves Volksdeutsche ("ethnic Germans"), and some of them committed atrocities against the Polish population and organized large-scale looting of property.

The Germans set up Jewish-run governing bodies in Jewish communities and ghettos – Judenrat (Jewish council) that served as self-enforcing intermediaries for managing Jewish communities and ghettos; and Jewish Ghetto Police (Jüdischer Ordnungsdienst), which functioned as auxiliary police forces tasked with maintaining order and combating crime.

The Polish Underground State's wartime Underground courts investigated 17,000 Poles who collaborated with the Germans; about 3,500 were sentenced to death.

Romania

See also Responsibility for the Holocaust (Romania), Antonescu and the Holocaust, Porajmos#Persecution in other Axis countries.

According to an international commission report released by the Romanian government in 2004, between 280,000 and 380,000 Jews died on Romanian soil, in the war zones of Bessarabia, Bukovina, and in territories formerly occupied by Soviets that came under Romanian control (Transnistria Governorate). Of the 25,000 Romani deported to concentration camps in Transnistria, 11,000 died.

Though much of the killing was committed in the war zone by Romanian and German troops, in the Iaşi pogrom of June 1941 over 13,000 Jews died in trains traveling back and forth across the countryside.

Half of the estimated 270,000 to 320,000 Jews living in Bessarabia, Bukovina, and Dorohoi County were murdered or died between June 1941 and the spring of 1944. Of  these, between 45,000 and 60,000 Jews were killed in Bessarabia and Bukovina by Romanian and German troops within months of the entry of the country into the war during 1941. Even after the initial killings, Jews in Moldavia, Bukovina and Bessarabia were subject to frequent pogroms, and were concentrated into ghettos from which they were sent to camps in Transnistria built and run by the Romanian authorities.

Romanian soldiers and gendarmes also worked with the Einsatzkommandos, German killing squads, tasked with massacring Jews and Roma in conquered territories, the local Ukrainian militia, and the SS squads of local Ukrainian Germans (Sonderkommando Russland and Selbstschutz). Romanian troops were in large part responsible for the 1941 Odessa massacre, in which from October 18, 1941 to mid-March 1942 Romanian soldiers, gendarmes and police, killed up to 25,000 Jews and deported more than 35,000.

The lowest respectable mortality estimates run to about 250,000 Jews and 11,000 Roma in these eastern regions.

Nonetheless, half of the Jews living within the pre-Barbarossa borders survived the war, although they were subject to a wide range of harsh conditions, including forced labor, financial penalties, and discriminatory laws. All Jewish property was nationalized.

A report commissioned and accepted by the Romanian government in 2004 on the Holocaust concluded:
Of all the allies of Nazi Germany, Romania bears responsibility for the deaths of more Jews than any country other than Germany itself. The murders committed in Iasi, Odessa, Bogdanovka, Domanovka, and Peciora, for example, were among the most hideous murders committed against Jews anywhere during the Holocaust. Romania committed genocide against the Jews. The survival of Jews in some parts of the country does not alter this reality.

Soviet Union

1939–1941 

During the invasion of Poland and Western Europe (1939–1941) the Soviet Union presented a friendly stance towards Germany with a joint military parade, several German-Soviet commercial agreements and Gestapo–NKVD conferences on suppressing resistance in the occupied territories.

After 1941 
Following Operation Barbarossa, Germany occupied large areas of the western Soviet Union, parts of which remained under German control until late 1944. 

The Waffen-SS recruited from many nationalities living in the Soviet Union and the German government attempted to enroll Soviet citizens voluntarily for the Ostarbeiter program; originally this effort worked well, but the news of the terrible conditions faced by workers dried up the flow of new volunteers and the program became forcible.

Central Asia 

Although Turkic peoples were  initially seen as "racially inferior" by the Nazis, this changed in autumn 1941. Given the difficulties of their invasion of the Soviet Union, the Nazis attempted to harness the anti-Russian sentiment of Turkic peoples in the Soviet Union. The first Turkestan Legion was mobilized in May 1942.

The Ostlegionen contained between 275,000 and 350,000 "Muslim and Caucasian" volunteers and conscripts.

Russia 

In Russia proper, ethnic Russians governed the semi-autonomous Lokot Autonomy in Nazi-occupied Russia. On 22 June 1943, a parade of the Wehrmacht and Russian collaborationist forces was welcomed and positively received in Pskov. The entry of Germans into Pskov was labelled "Liberation day" and the Russian tricolor flag was included in the parade inspiring "scenes of moving patriotism.

Kalmykians 
The Kalmykian Cavalry Corps was composed of about 5,000 Kalmyks who chose to join the retreating Germans in 1942 rather than remain in Kalmykia as the German Army retreated before the Red Army. Stalin subsequently declared the Kalmyk population as a whole to be German collaborators in 1943 and ordered mass deportations to Siberia suffering great loss of life.

Ukraine 

Before World War II, the territory of present-day Ukraine was divided primarily between the Ukrainian SSR of the Soviet Union and the Second Polish Republic. Smaller regions were part of Romania and Hungary. Large numbers of Ukrainians from the Ukrainian SSR fought in the Red Army.

The negative impact of Soviet policies implemented in the 1930s was still fresh in the memory of Ukrainians. These included the Holodomor of 1932–33, the Great Terror, the persecution of intellectuals during the Great Purge of 1937–38, the massacre of Ukrainian intellectuals after the annexation of Western Ukraine from Poland in 1939, and the introduction and implementation of collectivization.

The Ukrainians also remembered that their country's brief independence from 1917 to 1920 was helped by a treaty with the Central Powers and intervention by German forces.

During the period of occupation, Nazi-controlled Ukrainian newspaper Volhyn wrote that "The element that settled our cities (Jews) ... must disappear completely from our cities. The Jewish problem is already in the process of being solved.There is evidence of some Ukrainian participation in the Holocaust. Kyiv's auxiliary police participated in rounding up of Jews who were directed to the 1941 Babi Yar massacre. 

On 18 September 1941 in Zhytomyr, 3,145 Jews were murdered with the assistance of the Ukrainian People's Militsiya (Operational Report 106). In Korosten, Ukrainian militia rounded up 238 Jews for liquidation (Operational Report 80) and carried out the killings by themselves  similar to Sokal, where on 30 June 1941 they arrested and executed 183 Jews. At times, the assistance was more active. Operational Report 88 informs that on 6 September 1941, for example, 1,107 Jewish adults were shot by the German forces while the Ukrainian militia unit assisting them liquidated 561 Jewish children and youths.

On 28 April 1943, German Command announced the establishment of the 14th Waffen Grenadier Division of the SS (1st Galician). It has been accounted that approximately 83,000 people volunteered for service in the Division. The Division was used in Anti-partisan operations in Poland, Czechoslovakia and Yugoslavia, and in the fight against the Soviet forces during the Brody offensive and Vienna offensive. Those that survived surrendered to the Allies and the bulk emigrated to the West, primarily England, Australia and Canada.

Ukrainians participated in crushing the Warsaw Ghetto Uprising of 1943 and the Warsaw Uprising of 1944 where a mixed force of German SS troops, Russians, Cossacks, Azeris and Ukrainians, backed by German regular army units—killed up to 40,000 civilians.

The Nazis estimated that there were 180,000 Ukrainian volunteers serving with units scattered all over Europe and proposed to merge them into a single force. The Ukrainian Liberation Army (UVV) was formed by the German Army in 1943 to collect them together.

Belarus 

In Byelorussia under German occupation, local pro-independence politicians attempted to use the Nazis to reestablish an independent Belarusian state. A Belarusian representative body – the Belarusian Central Council – was created under German control in 1943 but had no real power and concentrated mainly on managing social issues and education. Belarusian national military units (the Byelorussian Home Defence) were only created a few months before the end of the German occupation.

Many Belarusian collaborators retreated with German forces in the wake of the Red Army advance. In January 1945, the 30th Waffen Grenadier Division of the SS (1st Belarussian) was formed from the remains of Belarusian military units. The division participated in a small number of battles in France but demonstrated active disloyalty to the Nazis and saw mass desertion.

Transcaucasia 

Ethnic Armenian, Georgian, Turkic and Caucasian forces deployed by the Nazis consisted primarily of Soviet Red Army POWs assembled into ill-trained legions. Among these battalions were 18,000 Armenians, 13,000 Azerbaijanis, 14,000 Georgians, and 10,000 men from the "North Caucasus." American historian Alexander Dallin notes that the Armenian and Georgian Legions were sent to the Netherlands as a result of Hitler's distrust of them, and many later deserted. Author Christopher Ailsby called the Turkic and Caucasian forces formed by the Germans "poorly armed, trained and motivated", and "unreliable and next to useless".

The Armenian Revolutionary Federation (the Dashnaks) was suppressed in Armenia when the First Republic of Armenia was conquered by the Russian Bolsheviks in the Red Army invasion of Armenia in 1920 and thus ceased to exist. During World War II, some of the Dashnaks saw an opportunity to regain Armenia's independence. The Armenian Legion under Drastamat Kanayan participated in the occupation of the Crimean Peninsula and the Caucasus. On 15 December 1942, the Armenian National Council was granted official recognition by Alfred Rosenberg, the Reich Ministry for the Occupied Eastern Territories. The president of the Council was Ardasher Abeghian, its vice-president Abraham Guilkhandanian and it numbered among its members Garegin Nzhdeh and Vahan Papazian. Until the end of 1944 it published a weekly journal, Armenian, edited by Viken Shantn who also broadcast on Radio Berlin with the aid of Dr. Paul Rohrbach.

Yugoslavia 

On 25 March 1941, under considerable pressure the Yugoslav government agreed to the signing of the Tripartite Pact with Nazi Germany, guaranteeing Yugoslavia's neutrality. The agreement was extremely unpopular in Serbia and led to massive street demonstrations. Two days later, on 27 March, Serb military officers led by general Dušan Simović overthrew the regency and placed 17-year-old King Peter on the throne. Furious at the temerity of the Serbs, Hitler ordered the invasion of Yugoslavia. On 6 April 1941, without a declaration of war, combined German and Italian military armies invaded. Eleven days later Yugoslavia capitulated and was subsequently partitioned among the Axis states.

The Central Serbia region and the Banat were subjected to German military occupation in the Territory of the Military Commander in Serbia, Italian forces occupied the Dalmatian coast and Montenegro; Albania annexed the Kosovo region and part of Macedonia; Bulgaria received Vardar Macedonia (today's North Macedonia); Hungary occupied and annexed the Bačka and Baranya regions as well as Međimurje and Prekmurje;  the rest of Drava Banovina (roughly present-day Slovenia) was divided between Germany and Italy; Croatia, Syrmia and Bosnia were combined into the Independent State of Croatia, a puppet state under the direction of Croatian fascist Ante Pavelić.

Territory of the Military Commander in Serbia 

Serbia was placed under German military occupation, at first directly administered by Nazis, then under a puppet government led by General Milan Nedić. The main function of the government was to maintain internal order, under the authority of the German Command, with the use of local paramilitary units. The Wehrmacht Operations Staff never considered raising a unit to serve in the German armed forces. By mid 1943, the collaborationist forces in Serbia, (Serbian and ethnic Russian units), numbered between 25,000 and 30,000.

Serbian units 
Serbian collaborationist organizations the Serbian State Guard (SDS) and the Serbian Border Guard (SGS) reached a combined 21,000 men at their peak. The Serbian Volunteers Corps (SDK), the party militia of the fascist Yugoslav National Movement led by Dimitrije Ljotić reached 9,886 men; its members helped guard and run concentration camps and fought the Yugoslav Partisans and the Chetniks alongside the Germans. In October 1941, the Serbian Volunteer Corps participated in the Kragujevac massacre, arresting and delivering hostages to the Wehrmacht. The members of the Serbian Volunteer Corps had to take an oath stating that they would fight to death against both Communists and Chetniks.

Collaborationist Belgrade Special Police helped German units round up Jewish citizens for deportation to concentration camps. By the summer of 1942, most Serbian Jews had been exterminated. By the end of 1942 the Special Police had 240 agents and 878 police guards under the command of the Gestapo. After the liberation of the country in October 1944, the collaborationist forces retreated with the German army and were later absorbed into the Waffen-SS.

Almost from the start, two rival guerrilla movements, the Chetniks and the Partisans, engaged in a bloody civil war with each other, in addition to fighting against the occupying forces. Some Chetniks collaborated with the Axis occupation to fight the rival Partisan resistance, whom they viewed as their primary enemy, by establishing modus vivendi or operating as "legalised" auxiliary forces under Axis control.

In August 1941 Kosta Pećanac put himself and his Chetniks at the disposal of Milan Nedić's government, becoming the occupation regime's ‘legal Chetniks' At the peak of their strength in mid-May 1942, the two legal Chetnik auxiliary forces numbered 13,400 men; these detachments were dissolved by the end of 1942. Pećanac was captured and executed by forces loyal to his Chetnik rival Draža Mihailović in 1944. As no single Chetnik organization existed, other Chetnik units engaged independently in marginal resistance activities and avoided accommodations with the enemy. Over a period of time, and in different parts of the country, some Chetnik groups were drawn progressively into opportunist agreements: first with the Nedić forces in Serbia, then with the Italians in occupied Dalmatia and Montenegro, with some of the Ustaše forces in northern Bosnia, and after the Italian capitulation, also with the Germans directly. In some regions Chetnik collaboration became "extensive and systematic". The Chetnik groups referred to this collaboration as "using the enemy".

Ethnic Russian units 
The Auxiliary Police Troop and the Russian Protective Corps were paramilitary units raised in the German-occupied territory of Serbia, composed exclusively of anti-communist White émigrés or Volksdeutsche from Russia, under the command of General Mikhail Skorodumov (around 400 and 7,500 men respectively by December 1942). The force reached a peak size of 11,197 by September 1944. Unlike the Serbian units, the Russian Protective Corps was part of the German armed forces and its members took the Hitler Oath.

Banat 

Between April 1941 and October 1944, the Serbian half of the Banat was under German military occupation as an administrative unit of the Territory of the Military Commander in Serbia. Its daily administration and security were left up to its 120,000 Volksdeutsche, who represented 20% of the local population. In the Banat, security, anti-partisan warfare, and border patrols, were exclusively carried out by the Volksdeutsche in the Deutsche Mannschaft. In 1941, the Banat Auxiliary Police were created to serve in concentration camps. It had 1,553 members by February 1942. It was affiliated with the Ordnungspolizei and included some 400 Hungarians. The Gestapo in the Banat employed local ethnic Germans as agents. Banat Jews were deported and exterminated with the full participation of the Banat German leadership, the Banat Police and many ethnic German civilians.

According to German sources, as of 28 December 1943, the Volksdeutsche minority of the Banat had contributed 21,516 men to the Waffen SS, the auxiliary police, and the Banat police.

The 700,000 Volksdeutsche who lived in Yugoslavia were the basis for the 7th SS Volunteer Mountain Division Prinz Eugen, which towards the war's end included other ethnicities. The division's soldiers brutally punished civilians accused of working with partisans in both occupied Serbia and the Independent State of Croatia, going so far as to raze entire villages.

Josip Broz Tito, leader of the post-war Communist regime, nullified the rights of ethnic Germans, seized all of their property and expelled hundreds of thousands without a fair trial.

Montenegro 
The Italian governorate of Montenegro was established as an Italian protectorate with the support of Montenegrin separatists known as Greens. The Lovćen Brigade was the militia of the Greens who collaborated with the Italians. Other collaborationist units included local Chetniks, police, gendarmerie and Sandžak Muslim militia.

Kosovo 

Most of Kosovo and the western part of southern Serbia (included in Zeta Banovina) was annexed to Albania by fascist Italy and Nazi Germany. Kosovar Albanians were recruited into Albanian paramilitary groups known as the Vulnetari set up to assist Italian fascists maintain order, many Serbs and Jews were expelled from Kosovo and sent to internment camps in Albania.

The Balli Kombëtar militias, or Ballistas, were volunteer Albanian nationalistic groups that started as a resistance movement, then collaborated with the Axis Powers in hopes of seeing Greater Albania created. Military units were formed within the militias, among them the Kosovo Regiment, raised in Kosovska Mitrovica as a Nazi auxiliary military unit after Italian capitulation.
According to German reports, in early 1944 some 20,000 Albanian guerrillas led by Xhafer Deva  fought the Partisans alongside the Wehrmacht in Albania and Kosovo.

Macedonia 
In Bulgaria-annexed Vardar Macedonia, the occupation authorityt organized the Ohrana into auxiliary security forces. On 11 March 1943, Skopje's entire Jewish population was deported to the gas chambers of Treblinka concentration camp.

Slovene Lands 

The Axis powers divided the Slovene Lands into three zones. Germany occupied the largest, northern part. Italy annexed the southern part, and Hungary annexed the northeast part, Prekmurje. As in the rest of Yugoslavia, the Nazis used the Slovene Volksdeutsche to further their aims, in groups like the Deutsche Jugend (German Youth) which was used as an auxiliary military force for guard duty and fighting the partisans, and the Slovenian National Defense Corps.

The Slovene Home Guard was a collaborationist force formed in September 1943 in the Province of Ljubljana (then a part of Italy). It was led by former general Leon Rupnik but had limited autonomy, and at first, functioned as an auxiliary police force that assisted the Germans in anti-partisan actions. Later, it gained more autonomy and conducted most of the anti-partisan operations in  Ljubljana. Much of the Guard's equipment was Italian (confiscated when Italy dropped out of the war in 1943), although German weapons and equipment were used as well, especially later in the war. Similar, but much smaller units, were also formed in the Littoral (Primorska) and Upper Carniola (Gorenjska). The Blue Guard, also known as the Slovene Chetniks, was an anti-communist militia led by Karl Novak and Ivan Prezelj.

The Anti-Communist Volunteer Militia (MVAC), was under Italian authority. One of the biggest components of the MVAC was the Civic Guards, a Slovene volunteer military organization formed by the Italian Fascist authorities to fight the partisans, as well as some collaborationist Chetniks units. The Legion of Death, was another Slovene anti-partisan armed unit formed after the Blue Guard joined the MVAC.

Independent State of Croatia 

On 10 April 1941, a few days before Yugoslavia's capitulation, Ante Pavelić's Independent State of Croatia (NDH) was established as an Axis-affiliated state, with Zagreb as capital. Between 1941 and 1945, the fascist Ustaše regime collaborated with Nazi Germany, and engaged in independent persecution. According to the United States Holocaust Memorial Museum this resulted in the murder of approximately 30,000 Jews, between 25,000 and 30,000 Roma, and between 320,000 and 340,000 ethnic Serb residents of Croatia and Bosnia,
in camps like the infamous Jasenovac concentration camp.
The 13th Waffen Mountain Division of the SS Handschar (1st Croatian), created in February 1943, and the 23rd Waffen Mountain Division of the SS Kama (2nd Croatian), created in January 1944, were manned by Croats and Bosniaks as well as local Germans. Earlier in the war, Pavelić formed a Croatian Legion for the Eastern Front and attached it to the Wehrmacht. Volunteer pilots joined the Luftwaffe as Pavelić did not want to get his army directly involved for both propaganda reasons (Domobrans/Home Guards were a "chieftain of Croatian values, never attacking and only defending") and due to a safeguarding need for political flexibility with the Soviet Union.

Pavelić proclaimed Croats were the descendants of Goths to eliminate the leadership's inferiority complex and be better viewed by the Germans. The Poglavnik stated that "Croats are not Slavs, but Germanic by blood and race". Nazi German leadership was indifferent to this claim.

Bosnian Muslims 

In 1941 Bosnia became an integral part of the Independent State of Croatia. Bosnian Muslims were considered Croats of Islamic confession.

Foreign volunteers

Germany military

Although official Nazi policy barred non-Germans from joining the regular German army,  volunteers from many countries were permitted to join the Waffen-SS and the auxiliary police (Schutzmannschaft). Overall, nearly 600,000 Waffen-SS members were non-German, and some countries such as Belgium and the Netherlands contributed thousands of volunteers. Various collaborationalist parties in occupied France and the unoccupied Vichy zone assisted in establishing the Legion of French Volunteers Against Bolshevism. These volunteers initially counted some 10,000 volunteers and later became the 33rd Waffen Grenadier Division of the SS Charlemagne, one of the first SS divisions composed mostly of foreigners.

Following is a list of the 18 largest Waffen-SS divisions composed mostly or entirely of foreign volunteers (note that there were other foreign Waffen-SS divisions composed mostly of forced conscripts).

 Wiking
 Nordland
 1st Croatian
 1st Ukrainian
 1st Albanian
 Kama
 Nederland
 1st Hungarian
 2nd Hungarian
 1st Flemish
 Wallonien
 1st Russian
 1st Italian
 2nd Russian
 1st Belarussian
 33rd Waffen Grenadier Division of the SS Charlemagne (1st French)
 Landstorm Nederland

Apart from frontline units, volunteers also played an important role in the large Schutzmannschaft police auxiliary units in the German-occupied territories in Eastern Europe. After Operation Barbarossa, recruitment of local forces began almost immediately mostly at the orders of Heinrich Himmler. These forces were not members of the regular armed forces and were not intended for frontline duty, but were instead used for rear echelon activities including maintaining the peace, fighting partisans, acting as police and organizing supplies for the front lines. In the later years of the war, these units numbered almost 200,000.

By the end of World War II, 60% of the Waffen-SS was made up of non-German volunteers from occupied countries. The predominantly Scandinavian 11th SS Volunteer Panzergrenadier Division Nordland division along with remnants of French, Italian, Spanish and Dutch volunteers were the last defenders of the Reichstag in Berlin.

The Nuremberg Trials, in declaring the Waffen-SS a criminal organisation, explicitly excluded conscripts, who had committed no crimes. In 1950, The U.S. High Commission in Germany and the U.S. Displaced Persons Commission clarified the U.S. position on the Baltic Waffen-SS Units, considering them distinct from the German SS in purpose, ideology, activities and qualifications for membership.

French military volunteers

French volunteers formed the Legion of French Volunteers Against Bolshevism (LVF), Légion impériale, SS-Sturmbrigade Frankreich and finally in 1945 the 33rd Waffen Grenadier Division of the SS Charlemagne (1st French), which was among the final defenders of Berlin.

Jewish collaboration 
Jews in the racist optics of Nazi Germany occupied the lowest place. They were destined for removal, first through ghettoization and exile, and finally through extermination. Because of that the subject of debate is whether one can speak of Jewish collaboration at all. If one defines collaboration as voluntary cooperation based on an ideological premises then by definition Jewish collaboration could not exist. According to Yehuda Bauer, the only Jewish collaborationist group in occupied Europe was the "Group 13" that existed in the Warsaw Ghetto, whose collaboration was based on the belief in the inevitability of German victory. According to Bauer, in the case of other Jewish groups, one should speak rather of "forced cooperation," although, as he points out, some groups came close to collaboration. According to Evgeny Finkel, defining "cooperation" in this way is problematic with regard to the activities of some Judenrat leaders and Jewish police, who were corrupt, despotic and their actions were guided primarily by the desire for profit and their own survival. Finkel proposes defining cooperation as activity aimed at the survival of the community and its individual members, while collaboration would be activity to the detriment of the community or the survival of individual Jews. Finkel stresses that cooperation was always open and visible, while collaboration could be public or private, often secret.

In most cases, Jews who chose to collaborate did so in order to guarantee their survival, which distinguished them from the members of most other ethnic groups who undertook collaboration with Nazi Germany. The phenomenon of Jewish collaboration was often exploited by nationalist apologists from groups deeply implicated in the Holocaust, who used it to minimize their groups' role in the extermination of the Jews.

In order to streamline the process of the exclusion of Jews, and to ease the burden of management, the Germans established Jewish institutions in the ghettos. These included, first and foremost, Jewish administrative boards, usually called Judenrats, and the so-called Jewish police, responsible for maintaining order in the ghettos. Formally, the Jewish police were subordinate to the Judenrats, but in most ghettos they quickly became independent of them and even gained a higher position, reporting directly to the Germans. According to Aharon Weiss's research, the activities of the first wave of Judenrat leaders were primarily aimed at improving the well-being of the communities they headed. Only their successors, chosen by the Germans among the most corrupt, were blind executors of German orders and acted mainly for their own self-interest. In some of the larger ghettos, the Judenrats were forced to prepare lists and hand over people to the Germans for deportation. More often, only the Jewish police took part in deportations. In most places this never happened. The Jewish police were widely hated among other Jews, and their members were far more likely to be corrupt and self-interested than the Judenrat leaders. In 14 ghettos, Jewish police cooperated with the resistance movement.

A separate form of collaboration was the activity of Jewish agents and informers of the German secret services and police. In most cases, they acted voluntarily, in order to gain monetary reward, power and status. They also believed collaboration increased their chance for survival. In Berlin, the Gestapo mobilized Jewish informants under threat of death. They took part in organizing provocations and arresting Jews hiding outside the ghetto or trying to escape from it, they also helped find people involved in smuggling, producing illegal documents or having contacts with the underground. They were widely regarded as influential people who could get things done with the Germans. They often took advantage of their position by taking bribes or helping selected individuals. Witold Mędykowski assesses this phenomenon as marginal; in a population of 15-20 thousand people in the Kraków ghetto, the number of informers is estimated at between a dozen and several dozen people. Informers were fought by the Jewish resistance, and by the Polish resistance but only if their activities harmed the Polish underground. The "Group 13" from the Warsaw ghetto, led by Abraham Gancwajch, was the only organized group of Jewish confidants who collaborated with the Germans on the basis of ideology.

Operating in Palestine since 1940, the Zionist Lehi group of about 100 members, led by Abraham Stern, regarded the British Empire as its main enemy. In January 1941, they offered an anti-British partnership to Germany in exchange for allowing European Jews to emigrate to Palestine.

In post-war Israel, many Jewish policemen have been brought to trial. In Poland after the war, 1,800 people were convicted by the courts for anti-Semitic persecution during the war. Among them, 44 were Jews, in their proceeding Central Committee of Polish Jews participated actively. In Western Europe, Jews accused of collaboration faced honour courts. In the Soviet Union, Jewish collaborators, such as police officers, were initially tried like any other collaborator for "treason to the motherland."

Business collaboration 

A number of international companies have been accused of having collaborated with Nazi Germany before their home countries' entry into World War II, though it has been debated whether the term "collaboration" is applicable to business dealings outside the context of overt war. American companies that had dealings with Nazi Germany included Ford Motor Company, Coca-Cola, and IBM. 

Brown Brothers Harriman & Co. acted for German tycoon Fritz Thyssen, who helped finance Hitler's rise to power. The Associated Press supplied images for a propaganda book called The Jews in the USA, and another titled The Subhuman.

In December 1941, when the United States entered the war against Germany, 250 American firms owned more than $450 million of German assets. Major American companies with investments in Germany included General Motors, Standard Oil, IT&T, Singer, International Harvester, Eastman Kodak, Gillette, Coca-Cola, Kraft, Westinghouse, and United Fruit. Many major Hollywood studios have also been accused of collaboration, in making or adjusting films to Nazi tastes.

German financial operations worldwide were facilitated by banks such as the Bank for International Settlements, Chase and Morgan, and Union Banking Corporation. 

Robert A. Rosenbaum writes: "American companies had every reason to know that the Nazi regime was using IG Farben and other cartels as weapons of economic warfare"; and he notes"as the US entered the war, it found that some technologies or resources could not be procured, because they were forfeited by American companies as part of business deals with their German counterparts."

After the war, some of those companies reabsorbed their temporarily detached German subsidiaries, and even received compensation for war damages from the Allied governments.

See also 
 Blue Division
 Collaborationism
 Collaboration: Japanese Agents and Local Elites in Wartime China
 Finland in World War II
 German-occupied Europe
 Italian Civil War
 International Commission for the Evaluation of the Crimes of the Nazi and Soviet Occupation Regimes in Lithuania
 List of Allied traitors during World War II
 Molotov–Ribbentrop Pact
 Pursuit of Nazi collaborators
 Resistance during World War II
 Responsibility for the Holocaust

Notes

References

Works cited

 Beinin, Joel. The Dispersion of Egyptian Jewry: Culture, Politics, and the Formation of a Modern Diaspora. Berkeley:  University of California Press,  c1998 1998. http://ark.cdlib.org/ark:/13030/ft2290045n/ 
 
 

 

 
 
 
 Hamilton, A. Stephan (2020) [2008]. Bloody Streets: The Soviet Assault on Berlin, April 1945. Helion & Co. ISBN 978-1912866137

Further reading 

 Birn, Ruth Bettina, Collaboration with Nazi Germany in Eastern Europe: the Case of the Estonian Security Police. Contemporary European History 2001, 10.2, 181–198.
 Christian Jensen, Tomas Kristiansen and Karl Erik Nielsen: Krigens købmænd, Gyldendal, 2000 ("The Merchants of War", in Danish)
 Hirschfeld, Gerhard: Nazi rule and Dutch collaboration: the Netherlands under German occupation, 1940–1945 Berg Publishers, 1988
 Jeffrey W. Jones "Every Family Has Its Freak": Perceptions of Collaboration in Occupied Soviet Russia, 1943–1948 – Slavic Review Vol. 64, No. 4 (Winter, 2005), pp. 747–770
 Kitson, Simon (2008). The Hunt for Nazi Spies: Fighting Espionage in Vichy France. Chicago: University of Chicago Press.
 Klaus-Peter Friedrich [Collaboration in a "Land without a Quisling": Patterns of Cooperation with the Nazi German Occupation Regime in Poland during World War II] – Slavic Review Vol. 64, No. 4 (Winter, 2005), pp. 711–746
 Rafaël Lemkin, Axis Rule in Occupied Europe: Laws of Occupation, Analysis of Government, Proposals for Redress, Legal classics library,
World constitutions, Volume 56 of Publications of the -Carnegie Endowment for International Peace, Division of International Law,  1944
 Hitler's Europe: How the Nazis Ruled Europe,  by Mark Mazower, Penguin Books 2008 (paperback), Chapter 14, "Eastern Helpers", pages 446-47
 
 Nazism, a history in documents and eyewitness accounts, 1919-1945, Volume II: Foreign Policy, War and Racial Extermination, edited by J. Noakes and G. Pridham, Schocken Books (paperback), 1988,

Estonia

Jewish collaboration

External links 

 
The Holocaust
Axis powers